Federal Route 134, or Jalan Pengkalan Kubur, is a federal road in Kelantan, Malaysia. The Kilometre Zero of the Federal Route 134 starts at Pengkalan Kubur

Features
At most sections, the Federal Route 134 was built under the JKR R5 road standard, allowing maximum speed limit of up to 90 km/h.

Kilometre zero

List of junctions and towns

References

Malaysian Federal Roads